The Senate Pact 2023 is an election agreement concluded between the Civic Coalition, the New Left, the Polish People's Party and Poland 2050 for the 2023 Polish Senate election, signed on 28 February 2023 by Marcin Kierwiński (KO), Dariusz Wieczorek (NL), Piotr Zgorzelski ( KP-PSL) and Jacek Bury (PL2050). 

The agreement assumes close cooperation regarding the conduct of the election campaign; in each electoral district for the Senate of the Republic of Poland, one common candidate for Senator of the Republic of Poland, agreed by the parties to the Agreement, will be put forward. Candidates recommended by parties to the Agreement and political parties cooperating will have the exclusive right to use the official logo of the coalition. 

In order to implement the Agreement, an Organizational Team was established, whose work is managed by a representative of the Yes! For Poland - Civic Coalition Senator Zygmunt Frankiewicz. The team's task is to divide the electoral districts into individual parties to the Agreement, prepare proposals for candidates for Senators of the Republic of Poland and develop a concept for conducting an election campaign. The first informal Senate pact was concluded before the parliamentary elections in 2019.

References 

Political opposition organizations
Political parties established in 2023
Political party alliances in Poland
2023 establishments in Poland